The Good Doctor is author Damon Galgut's fifth novel. It was published in the United Kingdom by Atlantic Books and by Grove Press in the United States on 9 January 2004. The Good Doctor focuses on one doctor's struggle with his conscience in a rural hospital in post-apartheid South Africa. It was shortlisted for the Man Booker Prize in 2003.

References 

21st-century South African novels
2003 novels
Novels set in hospitals
Novels by Damon Galgut
Atlantic Books books